Popeștii may refer to:

Popeştii de Jos, a commune in Drochia District, Moldova
Popeştii de Sus, a commune in Drochia District, Moldova
Popeştii Noi, a village in Petreni Commune, Drochia District, Moldova
Popeștii de Jos and Popeștii de Sus, villages in Vadu Moților Commune, Alba County, Romania